Virgil Vries (born 29 March 1989) is a Namibian football goalkeeper who plays for South African club Moroka Swallows.

Club career
In January 2012 he was loaned to second division side Carara Kicks.

Later in 2012, he signed a short-term contract with Orlando Pirates in the Namibian Premier League. In January 2013 he goes to Maritzburg United F.C. in the Premier Soccer League. Since then he made 27 appearances for the club and keep a clean sheet in eight games and conceding in these games 23 goals.

Leaving Kaizer Chiefs in the summer 2019, Vries joined Moroka Swallows on 26 September 2019.

International career
Virgil Vries is eligible to play for Namibia. He made his debut for the Namibia national football team on the 4 June 2011 against the Burkina Faso national football team in a 1–4 loss for Namibia. As of 1 June 2014 he has played 11 games for Namibia and kept a clean sheet in five games.

References

External links
 
 

1989 births
Namibia international footballers
Namibian expatriate footballers
Namibian men's footballers
Association football goalkeepers
Living people
Eleven Arrows F.C. players
Lamontville Golden Arrows F.C. players
Maritzburg United F.C. players
Orlando Pirates S.C. players
Baroka F.C. players
Kaizer Chiefs F.C. players
Moroka Swallows F.C. players
South African Premier Division players
National First Division players
People from Keetmanshoop
Expatriate soccer players in South Africa
Namibian expatriate sportspeople in South Africa
Carara Kicks F.C. players